Falkland Oil and Gas Ltd, abbreviated to FOGL, was an energy company registered in the Falkland Islands and headquartered in London, the United Kingdom.  Its business was based on exploring for offshore oil reserves off the coast of the Falklands. It owned the right to extract oil from a number of blocks to the east and the south of the islands.

FOGL was listed on the Alternative Investment Market of the London Stock Exchange. The company issued an initial public offering on 14 October 2004, debuting at a price of 40p. The share price peaked at 267p in June 2010, but slumped by half on 12 July 2010, when it was found that one of its prospect wells, Toroa, was empty - as of 1 March 2015, the share price had dropped to ~31 pence.

The company merged with Rockhopper Exploration on 18 January 2016.

Operations 
North Falkland Basin in millions (106) barrels and cubic metre of oil equivalent.

South and East Falkland Basin in millions (106) barrels and cubic metre of oil equivalent.

Legal issues
Due to the ongoing disputed nature of the Falkland Islands, FOGL received criticism from Argentina. On 30 April 2014 FOGL announced the following in their annual report;

References

External links

Economy of the Falkland Islands
Oil and gas companies of the United Kingdom